Barley is a cereal crop.

Barley may also refer to:

 Barley (surname)
 Barley, Hertfordshire, England
 Barley, Lancashire, village in the civil parish of Barley-with-Wheatley Booth, Lancahsire, England
 Barley, a truce term used in Scotland and parts of England and Wales
 Barley Bank, sportsground in Darwen, England
 Barley Bree, Irish/Canadian band
 Barley End, hamlet in Buckinghamshire, England
 Barley Hall (built 1360) an old house in York
 Barley Motor Car Co. American Car maker from 1913 to 1929
 Barley River, a tributary of the Malbaie River in Lac-Pikauba, Quebec, Canada

See also 
 The Barley Mow song and common pub name